is a volcanic Japanese island in the Philippine Sea. It is one of the Izu Seven Islands group of the seven northern islands of the Izu archipelago.
Kōzushima is administratively part of Kōzushima Village under Ōshima Subprefecture of Tokyo Metropolis. , the island's population was 1,952. Kōzushima is also within the boundaries of the Fuji-Hakone-Izu National Park.

Geology
Kōzu-shima is a compound volcanic island 6 km in length with a maximum width of 4 km. The island is formed from a cluster of eighteen lava domes, with rhyolite and pyroclastic ash deposits. Compared with most of the other islands in the Izu archipelago, Kōzu-shima is relatively flat, with small eroded hills, and lacks the high coastal cliffs found on the other islands. Earthquake swarms have occurred at Kōzu-shima during the 20th century.

Climate

Important Bird Area
The island has been recognised as an Important Bird Area (IBA) by BirdLife International because it supports populations of Japanese wood pigeons, Tristram's storm petrels, Japanese murrelets, Ijima's leaf-warblers, Pleske's grasshopper warblers and Izu thrushes.

History
Kōzu-shima has been inhabited since at least the Japanese Paleolithic era, and archaeologists have found Jōmon period stone tools made from obsidian in Shizuoka and Yamanashi Prefectures. Under the Ritsuryō system of the early Nara period, the island was part of Suruga Province. It was transferred to Izu Province when Izu separated from Suruga in 680 AD. During the Heian period, obsidian was the primary export from the island.

See also 
 List of islands of Japan
 List of volcanoes in Japan

Notes

References
 Teikoku's Complete Atlas of Japan, Teikoku-Shoin., Ltd. Tokyo 1990,

External links

 Kozushima Village Official Website
 Kozushima - Japan Meteorological Agency 
  - Japan Meteorological Agency
 Kozu Shima Volcano Group - Geological Survey of Japan
 

Izu Islands
Active volcanoes
Islands of Tokyo
Important Bird Areas of the Nanpo Islands
Seabird colonies
VEI-4 volcanoes